Lalaloopsy is a children's television series based on the Lalaloopsy dolls from MGA Entertainment. The series was ordered on February 11, 2013 for a spring 2013 premiere. It premiered on Nickelodeon on March 29, 2013 and ended on September 14, 2015, with a total of 52 episodes over the course of 2 seasons.

Series overview

Episodes

Season 1 (2013–14)

Season 2 (2014–15)

References

External links
 

Lists of American children's animated television series episodes

pl:Lalaloopsy#Spis odcinków